Princess Lalla Meryem of Morocco (born 26 August 1962 in Rome, Italy) is the first daughter and eldest child of the late King Hassan II of Morocco and his wife, Lalla Latifa Amahzoune.

Biography 
After she obtained her Baccalaureat in 1981, Princess Lalla Meryem was appointed by her father as the President of Social Works of the Royal Army Forces.

On 15 September 1984, she married Fuad Filali (born 1957), ex-CEO of ONA Group, and the son of former Prime Minister and Foreign Affairs Minister Abdellatif Filali. They had two children, a daughter and a son:

 Sharifa Lalla Soukaïna Filali (born 30 April 1986 in Rabat). On 11 October 2013, she married Mohammed El Mehdi Regragui (they divorced in 2019). On 27 September 2015, she gave birth to twins:
 Hassan Regragui.
 Aya Regragui.
 Moulay Idris Filali (born 11 July 1988 in Rabat).

Princess Lalla Meryem has two brothers King Mohammed VI and Prince Moulay Rachid, and two sisters Lalla Asma and Lalla Hasna.

Holder of numerous prestigious official functions, Princess Meryem has focused much of her activities on the social and cultural realm. Princess Meryem is the President of the Moroccan association in support of UNICEF, President of the Hassan II Foundation for the Moroccans residing abroad, President of the Moroccan National Observatory of the Childs Rights and President of the Hassan II Foundation for the social works of the former soldiers and ex-combatants. In July 2001, she was nominated UNESCO Goodwill Ambassador with focus her Ambassadorship on UNESCO projects for women and children. Also Member of the Honorary Committee of the International Centre for Missing & Exploited Children.

Since 2003 she is President of the National Union of Moroccan Women (UNFM).

Using her Royal status, she continues her work on behalf of women and children and advocate their rights on an international level.

Honours

National honours
 Knight Grand Cordon of the Order of the Throne.

Foreign honours
 Honorary Dame Grand Cross of the Royal Victorian Order (United Kingdom, 27 October 1980).
 Grand Cross of the Order of Prince Henry (Portuguese Republic, 25 August 1994).
 Knight Grand Cross of the Royal Order of Isabella the Catholic (Kingdom of Spain, 16 September 2000).
 Grand Cordon of the Order of Merit (Lebanese Republic, 17 July 2001).

References

External links

1962 births
Living people
Moroccan princesses
Recipients of the Order of Isabella the Catholic
Knights Grand Cross of the Order of Isabella the Catholic
People from Rabat
Moroccan Army officers
Moroccan businesspeople
Alumni of the Collège Royal (Rabat)
Honorary Dames Grand Cross of the Royal Victorian Order
Grand Cordons of the Order of Merit (Lebanon)
Grand Crosses of the Order of Prince Henry
UNESCO Goodwill Ambassadors
Daughters of kings